Minihof-Liebau is a town in the district of Jennersdorf in the Austrian state of Burgenland.

Geography
Cadastral communities are Minihof-Liebau, Tauka and Windisch-Minihof.

Population

References

Cities and towns in Jennersdorf District
Slovenian communities in Burgenland